Assize or Assizes, in Old French originally "meeting, conference", may refer to judicial institutions or legal measures taken by those.

Judicial institutions
 Courts of Assizes, a former judicial institution in England and Wales
 Assize (Scotland), in Scots law a trial by jury
 Assizes (Ireland), an obsolete judicial inquest (Court of Assize)
 Cour d'assises, French court in charge of felonies
 Corte d'Assise, Italian court
 Council of Assizes, lawmaking body in New York after its capture from the Dutch
 Court of assizes, criminal court in Belgium
 European Assizes, a one-time assembly of the European Parliament and the national parliaments in 1990

Legal regulations and measures
 Assize of Bread and Ale, an obsolete English statute regulating the price, weight, and quality of the bread and beer
 Assize of Clarendon, 1166 act taken by King Henry II of England
 Assize of darrein presentment, action over right to appoint to a benefice
 Assize of mort d'ancestor, an obsolete action over inheritance of land
 Assize of novel disseisin, an obsolete action to recover lands after dispossession
 Assize of Northampton, additional legal measures taken by Henry II of England
 Grand Assize, 1179 English law about land disputes
 Assizes of Ariano, laws of the Kingdom of Sicily (1140)
 Assizes of Jerusalem, collection of medieval legal treatises used by the Crusaders
 Assizes of Romania, laws of the Latin Empire of Constantinople

Christianity
 Great Assize, term for the Last Judgment

See also
 Assize of Arms (disambiguation)
 Black Assize of Exeter 1586
 Black Assize of Oxford 1577
 Bloody Assize of 1814
 Bloody Assizes
 Clerk of Assize,  a position which existed England and Wales 1285–1971
 Manchester Assize Courts, building in Manchester, England